Founded in 1841, Corrs Chambers Westgarth (often referred to as Corrs) is a leading, independent Australian commercial law firm. Its clients include national and international corporations, governments, banks and financial sponsors.

The firm has relationships with leading law firms throughout Asia, the Americas, the Middle East and Europe.

History

Corrs Chambers Westgarth has its roots in the pre-gold rush days of Melbourne, dating back to when law firm Whiting and Byrne was formed in 1841. In 1883, Norton Smith Westgarth and Sanders was established in Sydney, followed two years later by Brisbane’s Chambers McNab and Co.

These three firms are the foundations of Corrs Chambers Westgarth, which was formed in 1991 by the merger of Corrs Australian Solicitors, Westgarth Middletons (Sydney) and Chambers McNab Tully and Wilson (Brisbane and Gold Coast). Corrs Australian Solicitors was formed two years earlier (initially with the name Corrs) via the merger of Corrs Pavey Whiting and Byrne, Adelaide’s Mollison Litchfield and Perth’s Keall Brinsden (founded in 1910).

Corrs has offices in Sydney, Melbourne, Brisbane, Perth, and Port Moresby.

Practice
According to the firm its main practice areas are:

 Arbitration
 Banking and Finance
 Board Advisory
 Class Actions
 Competition
 Corporate Commercial
 Employment and Labour
 Energy and Natural Resources
 Environment and Planning
 Financial Sponsors
 Intellectual Property
 Investigations
 Litigation
 Mergers & Acquisitions and Capital Markets
 Papua New Guinea
 Projects and Construction
 Real Estate
 Responsible Business and ESG
 Restructuring, Insolvency and Special Situations
 Tax
 Telecommunications, Media & Technology

In 2022, the firm was named Australian Law Firm of the year by Chambers Asia Pacific & Greater China Region. In 2021, the firm was named Law Firm of the Year and Commercial Team of the Year at the Australian Law Awards. It was also named Law Firm of the Year, 2022 for Corporate Law by Best Lawyers, Australia.

The firm regularly works on pro bono and volunteer work, including advising Aboriginal man and artist, Harold Thomas, the owner of the copyright in the Australian Aboriginal Flag, on the deal to assign copyright in the Flag to the Commonwealth Government. The firm also acted on behalf of Mr Noel Zihabamwe, an Australian human rights activist, in relation to the enforced disappearance of his two brothers in Rwanda.

Corrs Alumni

The following list includes people who have worked or consulted for Corrs Chambers Westgarth:

 The Hon Justice Michael Barker, former Federal Court Judge of Australia. 
 Andrew Bassat, CEO and Co-Founder of Seek Limited. 
 John Dahlsen, former Director of ANZ Bank. 
 John Denton AO, Secretary General and Board Member of the International Chamber of Commerce (ICC), and former diplomat.
 Liz Ellis AO, former Captain of the Australian Diamonds Netball Team.
 David Flavell, Executive Vice President, General Counsel and Corporate Secretary PepsiCo Inc
 Peter Grey, Independent Non-Executive Chairman of MLC Life Insurance, former CEO of the Australian Trade Commission and former Ambassador to Japan. 
 The Hon Justice Kim Hargrave, Supreme Court Judge of Victoria. 
 The Hon Joe Hockey, Australia’s former Ambassador to the United States of America (2016-2020), and former Treasurer of Australia (2013-2015).
 The Hon Justice Michael Lee, Federal Court Judge, and former Director of the Bell Shakespeare Company.
 Rod McGeoch, CEO of the Sydney Olympics 2000 Bid, Director of Ramsay Health Care Limited, Non-Executive Chairman of Chubb Insurance Australia and Former President of the Law Society of NSW. 
 Allan Myers AC, renowned Australian QC (current), Chancellor of Melbourne University, and currently ranked on the Australian Financial Review Rich List.
 Dr Geoff Raby AO, former Ambassador to China.
 The Hon Justice Iain Ross AO, President of the Fair Work Commission, and Federal Court Judge of Australia. 
 John Storey, former Chancellor of The University of Queensland, former Chairman of Suncorp Group Limited and Tabcorp Holdings Limited.
 Bernie Teague AO, former Supreme Court Judge of Victoria

References

External links
 
 Firm profile at Chambers and Partners 
 Firm profile at Legal 500 website

Law firms of Australia
Law firms established in 1841
1841 establishments in Australia